Wilbur Gordon Burroughs Sr. (June 13, 1884 – August 6, 1960) was an American track and field athlete who competed at the 1908 Summer Olympics. He finished eighth in the Greek discus throw event and tenth in the traditional discus throw; his result in the shot put is unknown. He was also a member of the American tug of war team that was eliminated in the first round.

References

1884 births
1960 deaths
Olympic track and field athletes of the United States
Olympic tug of war competitors of the United States
Athletes (track and field) at the 1908 Summer Olympics
Tug of war competitors at the 1908 Summer Olympics
American male discus throwers
American male shot putters